Air Nippon Airways may refer to:
 Air Nippon
 A mistaken way of saying All Nippon Airways